The following is a list of  indoor arenas in Tunisia, with a capacity of at least 1,000 Spectators. Most of the arenas in this list have multiple uses such as individual sports, team sports as well as cultural events and political events.

Currently in use

Under construction

Future Arenas

See also
List of indoor arenas in Africa
List of stadiums by capacity

References

External links
Tunisia at WorldStadiums.com

Indoor arenas in Tunisia
Indoor arenas
Tunisia
Indoor arenas